Nebria fontinalis fontinalis is a subspecies of ground beetle in the Nebriinae subfamily that can be found in Italy and Switzerland.

References

External links
Nebria fontinalis fontinalis at Fauna Europaea

Beetles described in 1890
Beetles of Europe